The Cemetery of the Eagles (Spanish:El cementerio de las águilas) is a 1939 Mexican historical war film directed by Luis Lezama and starring Jorge Negrete, Margarita Mora and José Macip. It is set during the Mexican–American War of the 1840s. The film's sets were designed by José Rodríguez Granada. The battles of Churubusco and Chapultepec were recreated. It premiered on 1 September 1939, the same day as the Second World War broke out in Europe. The film's overtly patriotic theme proved very popular at the Mexican box office.

Cast
 Jorge Negrete as Miguel de la Peña 
 Margarita Mora as Mercedes de Zúñiga y Miranda 
 José Macip as Agustín Melgar 
 Silvia Cardell as Ana María de Zúñiga y Miranda 
 Alfonso Ruiz Gómez as Rafael Alfaro 
 José Ortiz de Zárate as Don Pedro de Zúñiga y Miranda 
 Lolo Trillo as Doña Nieves de Zúñiga y Miranda 
 Pepe Martínez as Luis Manuel Martínez de Castro
 Miguel Wimer as General Nicolás Bravo 
 Ricardo Mondragón as Gral. Monterde 
 Adela Jaloma as Elvira 
 Miguel Inclán as Gral. Pedro Ma. Anaya 
 Manuel Pozos as Jose Ma. Alfaro 
 Víctor Velázquez as Juan de la Barrera 
 Carlos Mora as Vicente Suárez
 Ricardo Adalid as Juan Escutia 
 Paco Castellanos as Francisco Márquez 
 Manolo Fábregas as Fernando Montes de Oca
 Crox Alvarado as Capt. Alemán 
 Carlos López Aldama as Gen. Santa Ana
 Julio Ahuet as Invitado al baile 
 Rafael Baledón as Invitado al baile 
 Manuel Dondé as Sirviente 
 Tito Junco as Soldado 
 Víctor Junco as Soldado 
 Paco Martínez as Rejón, el diputado 
 Rubén Márquez as Invitado al baile 
 Guillermo Rivas
 José Ignacio Rocha as Severiano, cochero

References

Bibliography 
 Van Wagenen, Michael. Remembering the Forgotten War: The Enduring Legacies of the U.S./Mexican War. Univ of Massachusetts Press, 2012.

External links 
 

1939 films
1930s war drama films
1930s historical drama films
Mexican historical drama films
Mexican war drama films
Films set in the 1840s
Films set in Mexico City
1930s Spanish-language films
Films directed by Luis Lezama
Mexican black-and-white films
1939 drama films
1930s Mexican films